Cities in Love is a 2015 Chinese romance anthology film directed by Muye Wen, Runnian Dong, Yi Han, Fu Tien-yu and Jiatong Yi. It was released on August 20, 2015. The film features five love stories (each by a different director) set in five cities (Shanghai, Prague, Florence, Paris, Hokkaido.)

Cast
Yang Mi as 
Kai-Yuan Zheng as Pi Te
Jiang Shuying as Jiang 
Meng Li
Hyun-Jae Lee
Sandrine Pinna as Fan Li Sha Zhang
Huang Xuan as Liu Chang
Jiang Yiyan
Joseph Chang
Bai Baihe
Ethan Juan

Reception
The film earned  at the Chinese box office.

See also
Run for Love (2016), Chinese film with similar premise

References

External links

2015 romance films
Chinese romance films
Chinese anthology films
Heyi Pictures films